Cecil Newton Jr. (born March 20, 1986) is a former American football center. He was signed by the Jacksonville Jaguars as an undrafted free agent in 2009. He played college football at Tennessee State. He is the son of Cecil Newton Sr. and older brother of Cam Newton.

He was also a member of the Hartford Colonials, New Orleans Saints, Green Bay Packers and Baltimore Ravens.

Professional career

Jacksonville Jaguars
After going undrafted in the 2009 NFL Draft, Newton was signed by the Jacksonville Jaguars as an undrafted free agent on April 26. He was waived during final cuts on September 5 and re-signed to the team's practice squad the following day. The Jaguars promoted Newton to the active roster on December 21.

Hartford Colonials
Newton was drafted by the Hartford Colonials with the 11th overall pick in the 2011 UFL Draft. After the Colonials' suspension of operations for the 2011 season, Newton's rights were acquired by the Omaha Nighthawks in a dispersal draft.

New Orleans Saints
On August 1, 2011, Newton signed with the New Orleans Saints, but was waived on September 3 and re-signed to the practice squad the next day. However, he was released from the practice squad on September 5.

Green Bay Packers
On October 13, 2011, Newton was signed to the Green Bay Packers' practice squad following injuries to starters Chad Clifton and Bryan Bulaga. He was released on October 23.

Baltimore Ravens
On November 28, 2011, Newton was signed to the Baltimore Ravens practice squad.

Personal life
His father, Cecil Newton Sr., played college football, as a safety and linebacker, for Savannah State, and was cut from the pre-season rosters of the 1983  Dallas Cowboys and 1984 Buffalo Bills, as a safety on both teams.

His brother Cam Newton  
won the 2010 Heisman Trophy while playing quarterback for Auburn University, and won the 2010 National Championship during his tenure there. He was the first pick in the 2011 NFL Draft by the Carolina Panthers.

References

External links
Jacksonville Jaguars bio
Tennessee State Tigers bio

1986 births
Living people
Players of American football from Atlanta
Players of American football from Savannah, Georgia
American football centers
Tennessee State Tigers football players
Jacksonville Jaguars players
Hartford Colonials players
New Orleans Saints players
Green Bay Packers players